Viento sur was a 2014 Argentine miniseries.

Awards

Nominations
 2014 Martín Fierro Awards
 Best miniseries
 Best lead actress of Miniseries (Maite Zumelzu)

Argentine drama television series
Televisión Pública original programming
2014 Argentine television series debuts
Argentine television miniseries